Feito is a surname. Notable people with the surname include:

David Feito (born 1982), Spanish footballer 
Luis Feito (1929–2021), Spanish painter

See also
Feit